The 10th arrondissement of Marseille is a district (arrondissement)  in the city of Marseille. The district is located east of the City. It borders the 5th and 12th arrondissement in the north, the 11th in the east, the 9th in the south, the 8th in the southwest and the 6th in the west. It is governed locally together with the 9th arrondissement, with which it forms the 5th sector of Marseille.

Neighbourhoods 
The 10th arrondissement of Marseille includes six neighbourhoods (quartiers): la Capelette, Menpenti, Pont-de-Vivaux, Saint-Loup, Saint-Tronc, and La Timone and 25 IRIS including 24 IRIS housing and Prado Park.

Public transport 
The Capelette neighbourhood is very poorly served by public transport. Only the number 18 line from Saint Loup to Castellane passes through Capelette.

Important monuments 
The Capelette district, named after the disused Capeletto chapel on the Bonnefoy boulevard, has a railroad bridge that crosses the avenue, as well as the church of St Laurent on the St Jean boulevard.  It also has a beautiful garden, called the garden of Guy Azaïs.

Demography

Population of the neighborhoods

Education and training by neighbourhood in 2006

Unemployment rates by neighborhoods in 2006

Beneficiaries of supplementary universal health coverage (CMU-C) by neighbourhood 

Supplementary CMU (CMU-C) is a free complementary health plan that covers what is not covered by compulsory health insurance schemes.

Beneficiaries of the CMU-C by IRIS in 2008

Families by neighbourhood in 2006 

Single parent families and families with four children at 1 January 2006

Dwellings by neighbourhood 8/3/1999

Population of the neighbourhoods by age at 8/3/1999

References

External links
 Official website
 Dossier complet, INSEE

Arrondissements of Marseille